Gümüşgöze (literally "silver to the eye") is a Turkish place name that may refer to the following places in Turkey:

 Gümüşgöze, Alanya, a village in the district of Alanya, Antalya Province
 Gümüşgöze, Gündoğmuş, a village in the district of Gündoğmuş, Antalya Province

See also
 Gümüş (disambiguation), "silver"